A cash transfer is a direct transfer payment of money to an eligible person. Cash transfers are either unconditional cash transfers or conditional cash transfers. They may be provided by organisations funded by private donors, or a local or regional government.

Targeting
Cash transfer programmes in developing countries are constrained by three factors: financial resources, institutional capacity and ideology. Governments in poorer countries tend to have restricted financial resources, and are therefore limited in the amount they can invest both directly in cash transfers and in measures to ensure that such programmes are effective. The amount invested is influenced by ‘value for money’ considerations, as well as by political and ideological concerns regarding ‘free handouts’ and ‘creating dependency’.
As random allocations are not particularly effective, there are two main forms of targeting:
 means tested
 universal (everyone in a designated social, geographical, age or other such category)
Means testing potential recipients of cash transfers is the more politically acceptable, as money is not perceived to be wasted by including those who do not have a desperate need for the money ("leakage"). This can either be achieved through a screening process of potential recipients, or else by making the benefits of the transfers so low only the most desperate will apply. Yet there are also many problems associated with this method as the transaction costs of screening are very high, due to the need to pay for assessment, the travelling cost of candidates to and from the assessment and also the potential risks for corruption. There also may be a negative effect on social capital as resentment develops of those who receive support by those who do not.

A universal approach, i.e.selecting all the under 5s, or pensioners, disabled, female led households, etc., does have many advantages as it increases social unity amongst a section of society benefitting from the programme and avoids the transaction costs of screening. A universal approach requires carefully selecting a target group as some groups may cover a greater number of poor families, but include the less needy. Similarly a more narrow recipient group risks excluding many of those who do actually need support.

Lump sums
One method of managing a cash transfer is to provide all the money at once in a lump sum, rather than in small regular amounts. Researchers at the Overseas Development Institute carried out a study on the effectiveness of the Swiss Agency for Development Cooperation's experiments with lump sum cash transfers and came out with the following six findings:
 Lump sum transfers work better in post-emergency than developmental contexts as their potential to be rapidly transferred to the recipients suits the urgency of post-emergency requirements.
 Success of lump sum transfers greatly depends on the local market and whether there are long-term income generating investments to be made. Areas affected by illness (e.g. HIV/Aids) or other such problems are likely to benefit more from regular small payments.
 Economic conditions other than limited markets or limited investment opportunities are also important, for instance, if the scale of the transfer greatly exceeds several years of local incomes recipients are unlikely to be able to know how to prudently invest the cash.  Where there is a clear investment potential, care should be made to support the recipient while lump sum investment matures, e.g. someone who buys a cow still needs to eat while waiting for the long term benefits (calf, milk) and so must be helped in order to ensure s/he doesn't sell the cow.
 While business planning, skills enhancement and training support is useful, if a clear investment opportunity (fishing boat, cow, etc.) is available, that is normally enough.
 Context must be considered, e.g. people cannot build a house if they have no access to land.
 Large cash transfers risk creating corruption or being used as a tool to gain political support for the government.

Wider economic, political and social implications
Many governments in poorer countries, where cash transfers could potentially have the most impressive impact, are often unwilling to implement such programmes due to fears of inflation and more importantly, dependency on the transfers. Quite often it is NGOs who encourage the schemes. If introduced, these schemes are often directed at the non-working poor (although the DfID backed Hunger Safety Nets Programme is a notable exception). In sub-Saharan Africa transfer values are normally limited to 10 to 30% of the ultra poverty line, though donors are now recommending the provision of a transfer level equivalent to 100%.

Whether due to the cautious approach or not, studies have shown that inflation is often avoided as traders increase their stock in anticipation of the schemes. Furthermore, the projects have often helped to build the state's legitimacy as it helps ensure citizens survival and programmes are targeted at marginalised groups and support their integration (e.g. in Nepal successive governments have used cash transfers to help integrate marginalised groups and reduce the risk of conflict).

Monitoring and evaluating cash transfer programmes
Ensuring the participation of poor communities in the monitoring and evaluation (M&E) of social protection programmes – and cash transfer programmes in particular - is gaining support from donors and governments who see potential gains in efficiency, legitimacy and satisfaction.  ‘Participatory monitoring and evaluation’ (PM&E) techniques and mechanisms are particularly effective at giving a voice to the people who receive the money, and, when they work well, they serve increase the accountability of governments, local officials and programme implementers.

Qualitative and participatory research carried out by the Overseas Development Institute (in Kenya, Mozambique, the Occupied Palestinian Territories, Uganda and Yemen) investigating individual and community perceptions of cash transfer programmes  reveals that the money has a number of positive, and potentially transformative, effects on the lives of the individuals and families that receive them, including:

•	People prefer to receive cash than other forms of assistance (food aid, public works, etc.) because it gives them the freedom to spend the money on the things they feel they need.

•	People experience an increase in their quality of life e.g. they are able to construct permanent shelters, have three meals a day and pay health-related costs.

•	More children are going to school as a result of receiving the transfer.

•	Particularly vulnerable or excluded beneficiaries felt that they were now able to meet the basic needs of their families, giving them greater economic freedom, security and enhanced psychological well-being.

Examples
Temporary Assistance for Needy Families (TANF)
Social Security
Children's Allowance
Newborns' Allowance
Worker's Compensation
Bantuan Langsung Tunai (Indonesian for Direct Cash Assistance), implemented by Indonesian president Susilo Bambang Yudhoyono in 2005

Humanitarian cash transfers 
As of 2015, only approximately 6% of humanitarian aid is provided in the form of cash transfers and vouchers, even though evidence indicates that it is more cost-effective, better for recipients and more transparent than in-kind aid.

A High Level Panel on Humanitarian Cash Transfers was convened in 2015. It found that in many cases, cash transfers were better for people in humanitarian crises. For example:
 A study in Ecuador, Niger, Uganda and Yemen found that 18% more people could have been helped if everyone was given cash, not food.
 In Iraq, 70% of Syrian refugees resold large parts of their food aid, in order to purchase what they needed more urgently.
 In Somalia, 2.5 times more of aid budgets went directly to aid recipients when given cash rather than food aid.

In order to scale up cash transfers in humanitarian aid, organisations need to:
 Increase amount of unconditional cash transfers;
 Invest in planning and preparedness;
 Explore delivering cash transfers through private sector systems, longer-term social protection systems and digitally;
 Improve coordination in the humanitarian system.

Case Study: Sierra Leone
Research has been carried out by the Overseas Development Institute into the challenges of implementing cash transfers in Sierra Leone and in ensuring their success. After a decade of conflict over 70% of the population lives in poverty and over 25% in extreme poverty (defined as being unable to achieve the bare minimum nutritional food intake). Given the poverty and the high levels of fragmentation in society, cash transfer schemes have been small scale to date, but include:
 Meeting immediate income needs;
 Putting cash into the community and stimulating the local economy; and
 Empowering people by enabling autonomous decision-making over expenditure.
Any expansion of the system has to take into account:
 The risk (both real and perceived) of dependency
 Infrastructure
 Institutional capacity 
 Risk of corruption
 Affordability

Researchers at the Overseas Development Institute found that the perceived risk of dependency was very high and that transfers of tools, sewing machines, or agricultural inputs have proved to be more popular. Furthermore, organisations such as the World Food Programme were of the belief that giving food, instead of cash, in payment for public works was more culturally relevant, in an area where workers had traditionally been paid this way. Yet the actual risk of dependency proved to be far less than feared.
The research has also shown that despite poor infrastructure, administering cash transfers has not presented as great a challenge as expected. Informal networks have ensured cash is flowing from the urban to rural areas, even if by hand, and local councils and schools far from the capital are now also receiving payment through bank accounts and not in cash. The same goes for institutional capacity which is widely believed to be improving.

Corruption in Sierra Leone continues to pose a serious challenge and the country ranked only 142 out of 163 in Transparency International's 2006 rankings. Cash transfers are no more prone to corruption than other sources of government spending, yet specific parts of the process of implementation must be carefully monitored. 
Affordability is argued to be low. Total government expenditure on social protection was budgeted at around US$1.5 million in 2006 and US$2.8 million in 2007 and social protection expenditure is estimated at around 1.5% to 2.5% of non-salary, non-interest recurrent government expenditure, 0.3–0.6% of total government expenditure and a small fraction of a percentage of GDP.

GiveDirectly

GiveDirectly is a non-profit organization, headquartered in the United States and currently operating in Kenya, that aims to help people living in extreme poverty by making unconditional cash transfers to them via mobile phone (through m-Pesa). It is the first charity dedicated exclusively to cash transfers.  It claims that 90% of donor funds are utilized in the form of the actual cash transfers, with the remaining 10% being split between fees for money transfers and recipient identification costs. Their model is closer to the "lump sums" transfer model than the "regular income supplement" model that has historically been used more by governments.

Impacts on health 

The first comprehensive systematic review of the health impact of unconditional cash transfers included 21 studies, of which 16 were randomized controlled trials. It found that unconditional cash transfers may not improve health services use. However, they lead to a large, clinically meaningful reduction in the likelihood of being sick by an estimated 27%. Unconditional cash transfers may also improve food security and dietary diversity. Children in recipient families are more likely to attend school, and the cash transfers may increase money spent on health care. An update of this landmark review from 2022 confirmed these findings, plus concluded that there is now sufficient evidence that such cash transfers also reduce the likelihood of recipients living in extreme poverty. The present study concluded that cash along with ECD activities have positive impact on child development in Bangladesh.

Impacts on subjective wellbeing 
In 2022, a systematic review and meta-analysis of 45 studies examined the impact of cash transfers on self-reported subjective wellbeing and mental health outcomes, covering a sample of 116,999 individuals. After an average follow-up time of two years, the study found that cash transfers have a small but statistically significant positive effect on both subjective wellbeing and mental health among recipients. The value of the cash transfer, both relative to previous income and in absolute terms, is a strong predictor of the effect size.

See also

 Basic income
 Humanitarian aid
 Cash and Voucher Assistance
 Overseas Development Institute
 The Cash Learning Partnership

References

Further reading
 The Transfer Project
 The Cash Learning Partnership
 The Cash Atlas
 Hanlon, Joseph, Armando Barrientos and David Hulme. Just Give Money to the Poor: The Development Revolution from the Global South. Sterling, VA: Kumarian Press, 2010.
 

Public economics
Social programs
Private aid programs